Morris James Hutcheson (19 February 192816 July 2016) was an Australian rules footballer who played with Footscray in the Victorian Football League (VFL).

References

External links

2016 deaths
1928 births
Australian rules footballers from Victoria (Australia)
Western Bulldogs players